Keilor Downs College (abbreviated as KDC) is a government-funded high school which services the Keilor Downs area of Melbourne, Australia. The co-educational school caters for students from Year 7 to Year 12.

References

Public high schools in Victoria (Australia)
Educational institutions established in 1984
1984 establishments in Australia
Buildings and structures in the City of Brimbank